Big Run State Park is a public recreation area located at the northern end of the Savage River Reservoir, an impoundment of the Savage River, in Garrett County, Maryland. The state park occupies  in Savage River State Forest and encompasses the confluence of Monroe Run and Big Run. Park activities include boating, fishing, hiking, picknicking, and camping.

History
The park originated as the  Big Run Recreation Area, one of several Maryland areas that were developed by the Civilian Conservation Corps in the 1930s. In 1952, the Maryland State Planning Commission recommended that the "lightly used" recreation area be expanded to take advantage of its location on the reservoir that had been newly created on the Savage River.

Ecology
Climate
The park's climate is similar to mountain weather; cold winters accompanied by mild, humid summers. The park is located within the Western Appalachian Plateau, which gives rise to colder temperatures. The Savage River Reservoir rests in a canyon that experiences high winds, contributing to the weather changes.
Average coolest month: January (30-34 °F)
Average warmest month: July (74-80 °F)
Average wettest month: May
Wildlife
Red-tailed hawk, broad-winged hawk, great-horned owl, screech owl, songbirds, indigo bunting and other forest interior dwellers can be spotted within Big Run. Black bear, bobcat, white-tailed deer and raccoon are among the park's mammalian inhabitants. Grouse, great blue herons, minks, and ducks may be seen seasonally along the reservoir edge.
Flora
The park's forests contain oak, hickory and native hardwoods. Trout lilies and spring beauties bloom in April, trilliums and lady slippers in the months of May and June, while rhododendrons, bee balm and cardinal flowers bloom in July.

Activities and amenities
The park is accessible on New Germany Road from Interstate 68, Exit 24. It offers primitive campsites, group campsites, youth group campsite, and pavilions. Picnicking facilities are located in the park's day use area. The Savage River Reservoir is used for non-motorized boating, electric motoring, and fishing. Facilities include a boat ramp. Fishermen may find walleye, largemouth bass, crappie, yellow perch, bluegill, suckers and trout. The Monroe Run hiking trail and other trails are accessible from the state park. The adjacent Savage River State Forest has trails for multi-purpose use including snowshoeing or snowmobiling.

References

External links

Big Run State Park Maryland Department of Natural Resources

State parks of Maryland
State parks of the Appalachians
Parks in Garrett County, Maryland
Civilian Conservation Corps in Maryland
IUCN Category III